The Ireland women's cricket team toured Scotland in September 2022 to play three Women's Twenty20 International (WT20I) matches. This was the first time that The Grange Club in Edinburgh hosted a full women's international match.

Sarah Bryce captained Scotland in the first two matches of the series, in the absence of her older sister Kathryn. Ireland won the first match by 8 wickets, Orla Prendergast top-scoring with an unbeaten 75. Rain caused a delayed start to the second game and returned after 5 overs of Ireland's run chase, resulting in a 16-run DLS win for the visitors who clinched the series. The third game was abandoned due to rain, meaning that Ireland won the series 2–0.

Squads

WT20I series

1st WT20I

2nd WT20I

3rd WT20I

Notes

References

External links
 Series home at ESPNcricinfo

2022 in women's cricket
2022 in Scottish cricket
2022 in Irish cricket
International cricket competitions in 2022